The Norfolk Elk Horns or the shortened "Elks" was a primary moniker of the minor league baseball teams based in Norfolk, Nebraska between 1914 and 1941. The Norfolk minor league teams played as members of the Class D level Nebraska State League1914–1915, 1922–1923), Tri-State League (1924), Nebraska State League (1928–1938) and Western League (1939–1941). The Norfolk minor league teams hosted home games at Athletic Park.

The Norfolk Elks were a St. Louis Cardinals minor league affiliate in 1936. Norfolk played as an affiliate of the New York Yankees from 1937 to 1941 and adopted the Norfolk "Yankees" moniker in 1940.

History

Nebraska State League / Tri- State League 1914 to 1924
Minor league baseball began in Norfolk, Nebraska in 1914. The Norfolk Drummers became members of the eight–team Class D level Nebraska State League, replacing the Fremont Pathfinders franchise in league play.

At the home opener in 1914, it was noted Mayor Carl Verges threw the first pitch and Prof. Doering and the Battle Creek Band played. Before a reported crowd of 2,000, Norfolk lost to the York Prohibitionists by the score 3–1. At the local Y.M.C.A. bulletin boards were placed at the inside lobby and outside the building to report standings and scored. During away games, Norfolk fans would gather at the boards, waiting for the game score to be called in by phone and updated on the bulletin boards.

Fans yelling profanity in the presence of ladies at Norfolk home games were reprimanded by the police, who were present at games, including Police chief Jolly. A public apology, arrest or a $7.50 fine were all used to punish fans using profanity.

In a 1914 home game against the Beatrice Milkskimmers, it was reported police chief Jolly broke up a fight between Beatrice player Branon and umpire Dixon. According to the Norfolk paper, Branon attacked Dixon, Jolly intervened and arrested Branon. Branon was fined $7.50.

In their first season of play, the 1914 Norfolk Drummers placed 6th in the eight–team Nebraska State League final standings. The drummers ended the season with a record of 52–60, playing under managers Warren Cummings and Babe Towne. With no playoffs held, Norfolk finished 14.0 games behind the Grand Island Islanders in the final standings. Pitcher Verne Hirsch of Norfolk led the Nebraska State League with 244 strikeouts.

The Norfolk Drummers continued play in 1914 and folded during the Nebraska State League season. On June 28, 1915, the Drummers folded with a 24–13 record under returning manager Babe Towne. On July 18, 1914, the Nebraska State League folded.

After a seven season hiatus, the Norfolk Elk Horns won the pennant as the six–team Class D level Nebraska State League reformed in 1922. In June, 1922, it was reported the team bought three new Ford automobiles for travel, saving $1,000 over train travel. Norfolk finished the season in 1st place, with a record of 70–48. The Elk Horns finished a mere 0.5 game ahead of the 2nd place Lincoln Links in the final standings. Ernie Adams and Runt Marr served as managers. Norfolk lost in the league Finals as the Fairbury Jeffersons defeated Norfolk 4 games to 3. Norfolk player Claude Mitchell led the Nebraska State League with 21 home runs and player/manager Runt Marr won the batting title with a .364 average on a league leading 167 hits.  It was reported that admission to home playoff games was .55 cents and the team enjoyed large crowds for the games. The losers share for the playoff was estimated to be $24.00 per player. After the season, the town held a special dinner for the team at the Merchants Cafe. After the league ended, many of the players stay and barnstormed in the area. They were noted to have played against the town team in Snyder, Nebraska for $500.00.

The Norfolk Elk Horns were the runner–up in the 1923 Nebraska State League. With a final record of 68–66, the team placed 2nd, playing under the direction of manager Ed Reichle. Norfolk finished the season 2.5 games behind the Lincoln Links in the final standings of the six–team league. No playoffs were held.

In 1924, Norfolk briefly played as members of the six–team Class D level Tri-State League. On July 17, 1924, the league folded. Norfolk placed 3rd 31–30  3rd, playing under manager Nig Lane when the league disbanded. Norfolk finished 2.0 games behind the Beatrice Blues and Sioux Falls Canaries who were tied for 1st place with 35–30 records in the final standings.

Nebraska State League 1928 to 1938
The 1928 Norfolk Elks resumed minor league play as the eight–team class D level Nebraska State League reformed. Norfolk would continue play in the league through the 1938 season, as other league franchises relocated or folded during the period. The 1928 Elks ended the season with a record of 55–66, playing under manager Lefty Wilkus. The team placed 6th and ended the season 16.5 games behind the 1st place McCook Generalsin the final standings as no playoffs were held.

The Norfolk Elks placed 7th in the 1929 Nebraska State League. Playing under returning manager Lefty Wilkus, Norfolk ended the season with a record of 43–73, finishing 31.0 games behind the McCook Generals in the Nebraska State League final standings. John Smith of Norfolk hit 15 home runs to lead the league.

The Norfolk Elks continued play in the 1930 eight–team Nebraska State, placing 6th. Ending the season with a record of 56–65, playing under manager Hal Brokaw, the Elks finished 30.0 games behind the champion McCook Generals in the final standings.

The 1931 Norfolk Elks were managed by Joe McDermott. Norfolk ended the 1931 with a final record of 47–58 to place 5th in the six–team league. Playing under returning manager Joe McDermott, the Elks finished 18.0 games behind the Grand Island Islanders in the final standings of the Nebraska State League. Grand Island won the Finals over the North Platte Buffaloes. Sebastian Wagner of Norfolk hit 22 home runs to lead the Nebraska State League.

The 1932 Norfolk Elks won the Nebraska State League pennant. Playing again under manager Joe McDermott, Norfolk finished 1st in the regular season standings with a record of  75–35. The Elks finished 13.5 games ahead of the 2nd place Beatrice Blues in the six–team league. Norfolk lost in Finals, as the Beatrice Blues defeated Norfolk 4 games to 3. Norfolk pitcher Otto Davis, led the league with 24 wins, while teammate Luke Bucklin had a 1.89 ERA to lead the league. Norfolk player Walt Gannon had 150 total hits, most in the league.

The Norfolk Elks won their second consecutive pennant in the 1933 four–team Nebraska State League regular season. Led by Joe McDermott the Elks finished with a record of 60–45 to place 1st, just 0.5 game ahead of the 2nd place Beatrice Blues. Norfolk lost in Finals, as the Beatrice Blues won 5 games and the Norfolk Elks 4. Ray Bertram of Norfolk had 156 total hits to lead the Nebraska State League.

1934 Norfolk Elks placed 2nd in the four–team league, as Joe McDermott continued as manager. The Elks ended the season with a record of 60–49, finishing 8.5 games behind the Lincoln Links in the final standings of the Nebraska State League. Pitcher Jack Farmer of Norfolk won 19 games to lead the Nebraska State League, while teammate George Silvey had 143 overall hits, most in the league.

The Norfolk Elks won the 1935 Nebraska State League championship. Norfolk ended the season in 2nd place with a record of 58–49 Managed by Pat Patterson, Norfolk finished 11.5 games behind the 1st place Sioux Falls Canaries in the final standings of the four–team Class D league. In the finals Norfolk defeated Sioux Falls 4 games to 3 to become league champions. Norfolk's John Grilli had 116 RBI to lead the league and teammate Orie Arntzen had 184 strikeouts to led the Nebraska State League.

Norfolk Elks continued Nebraska State League play in 1936 and became a minor league affiliate of the St. Louis Cardinals. With Joe McDermott returning as manager, the Elks finished with a record of 63–57 to place 3rd in the six–team league. The Elks finished 8.0 games behind the Sioux Falls Canaries in the final standings. Norfolk qualified for the playoffs and lost in the 1st round, as the Mitchell Kernels defeated Norfolk 3 games to 1. Bill A. James led the Nebraska State League with 29 home runs and fellow Norfolk player Dexter Savage paced the league with 128 RBI.

The 1937 Norfolk Elks became a New York Yankees minor league affiliate. Norfolk ended the season with a final record of 50–65, placing 4th in the six–team league and finisheing 31.0 games behind the 1st place Sioux Falls Canaries in the Nebraska State League final standings. Manager Doc Bennett began his four season stint as the Norfolk manager.

In Norfolk's final season of Nebraska State League play, the 1938 Norfolk Elks were Nebraska State League champions. Norfolk ended the 1938 with a record of 67–49 to place 2nd, playing under returning manager Doc Bennett. In the regular season standings, Norfolk finished 2.5 games behind the Sioux City Cowboys in the final standings. In the Finals Norfolk defeated Sioux City 4 games to 2 to become league champions.  The Nebraska State League folded following the 1938 season. When the league resumed play in 1956, Norfolk did not field a franchise in the league.

Western League 1939 to 1941
Continuing as a New York Yankees affiliate, the 1939 Norfolk Elks became members of the six–team Western League and won the league pennant. Playing again under manager Doc Bennett, the Elks ended the season with a record of 75–44 to place 1st in the regular season standings. Norfolk finished 8.0 games ahead of the 2nd place Sioux Falls Canaries. In the playoffs, Norfolk lost 1st round, as the Sioux City Soos defeated Norfolk 3 games to 2. William Morgan of Norfolk led the league with 17 home runs.

In 1940, the Western League reduced to four teams. The newly named "Norfolk Yankees" continued as an affiliate of the New York Yankees. The Yankees ended the 1940 in 1s place with a final regular season of 73–39. Norfolk finished 16.0 games ahead of the 2nd place Sioux Falls Canaries, managed again by Doc Bennett. In the Finals, Sioux Falls defeated Norfolk 4 games to 2.

In their final minor league season, Norfolk continued Western League play. The Norfolk Yankees' final season of play saw the franchise win their third consecutive pennant. Norfolk ended the 1941 in 1st place with a record of 64–44. The Yankees finished 2.0 games ahead of the 2nd place Cheyenne Indians, playing under manager Ray Powell. Frank Bocek led the league with 92 RBI. In the playoffs, Norfolk beat the Sioux City Cowboys 3 games to 2. The Pueblo Rollers won 3 games to Norfolk's  2 as the Yankees lost in Finals. The Western League did not play in the 1942 through 1946 seasons, with World War II interrupting play. When the 1947 Western League reformed, Norfolk did not field a franchise in the league.

Norfolk, Nebraska has not hosted another minor league team.

The ballpark
For their duration, Norfolk minor league teams were noted to have played home minor league games at Athletic Park. In 1922, the facility was rebuilt, with covered wooden grandstands installed behind home plate, bleachers down both foul lines and right field bleachers. The park was also used for the "Harvest Festival" and local fairs. The ballpark was located at North 4th Street & Prospect Avenue, Norfolk, Nebraska.

Timeline

Year–by–year records

Notable alumni

Orie Arntzen (1935)
Doc Bennett (1937–1940, MGR)
Jim Dyck (1941)
Marv Felderman (1936)
Oris Hockett (1931–1932)
Johnny Hopp (1936)
Hugh Luby (1931–1933)
Runt Marr (1922, MGR)
Max Marshall (1936)
Johnny Orr (1938)
Joe Orrell (1936)
Ray Powell (1941, MGR)
By Speece (1922)
Les Rock (1932)
Bill Starr (1932)
Babe Towne (1914–1915, MGR)
Bennie Warren (1934)

See also
Norfolk Drummers playersNorfolk Elks playersNorfolk Elk Horns playersNorfolk Yankees players

External links
Baseball Reference

References

Defunct minor league baseball teams
Professional baseball teams in Nebraska
Defunct baseball teams in Nebraska
Baseball teams established in 1922
Baseball teams disestablished in 1924
Nebraska State League teams
Norfolk, Nebraska
Defunct Tri-State League teams